Nuruddin Sameer (born 2 August 1998) is an Indian professional footballer who plays as both a right back and a right winger for Minerva Punjab in the I-League on loan from Indian Super League side Pune City.

Career
Nuruddin began his career in the AIFF Elite Academy where he also played internationally for India at the youth levels.

Minerva Punjab (loan)

In November 2016, Nuruddin was announced as part of the Minerva Punjab side that would play in the DSK Cup in Pune. Then, on 6 January 2016, it was announced that Nuruddin was with Minerva Punjab on loan from Pune City of the Indian Super League. He made his professional debut for Minerva Punjab in the I-League on 8 January 2017 against Chennai City. He started and played the full first-half before being substituted for Uttam Rai as Minerva Punjab drew 0–0.

International
Nuruddin represented India in both the under-16 and under-19 levels.

Career statistics

References

1998 births
Living people
People from Uttar Pradesh
Indian footballers
AIFF Elite Academy players
FC Pune City players
RoundGlass Punjab FC players
Association football defenders
Association football midfielders
Footballers from Uttar Pradesh
I-League players
India youth international footballers